Magione is a comune (municipality) in the Province of Perugia in the Italian region Umbria, located about 15 km west of Perugia. 
 
Magione borders the following municipalities: Castiglione del Lago, Corciano, Panicale, Passignano sul Trasimeno, Perugia, Tuoro sul Trasimeno, and Umbertide. It is located on the eastern shore of Lake Trasimeno.

To the east is the Autodromo dell'Umbria, an operating automobile and motorcycle circuit of the national level.

History
The town was home to a magione (pilgrim house) built in the Middle Ages by the Knights Templar, hence the current name. It was later owned by the Knights Hospitaller, who turned it into an abbey, which was fortified in the 14th century.

In 1502 it was the place where several Umbrian and Marche lords set a plot against Cesare Borgia. In the following centuries the castle housed some historical figures such as Pope Benedict XIV and Pope Pius VII.

References

External links
 

Cities and towns in Umbria